Jean-François Dagenais (born October 16, 1975) is a French-Canadian Juno Award winning record producer, mix engineer, guitarist and songwriter specializing in the rock and metal genres. Born and raised in Canada J-F is now a naturalized citizen of the United States living in Dallas, Texas. He is best known as guitarist for the death metal band Kataklysm and for producing and mixing many heavy metal albums and its subgenres.

Producer

Currently Jean-Francois Dagenais works out of his own studio, JFD Studio, which he founded in 2005. he received a Canadian GAMIQ award "Metal / Hardcore Album of the Year" for both his work on Kataklysm's 2010 Heaven's Venom and 2008 Prevail albums, as well as winning an award with Kataklysm for "Best Metal Group" at the Canadian Indie Music Awards. Dagenais is also well known for his work with bands like Malevolent Creation, Misery Index, Despised Icon, Thy Antichrist, Skinthelamb, Necronomicon, Kill Everything, Helsott, Dark Visions of Terror, Augury, Blackguard & Ex Deo.

Kataklysm member 
Jean-François Dagenais is the guitarist for the internationally acclaimed Canadian death metal band, Kataklysm. As opposed to many of the original members, Jean-François has been with Kataklysm since the band's inception in 1991. He has played guitar for all of these following albums:.

Albums 
 Kataklysm The Mystical Gate of Reincarnation (1993)
 Kataklysm Sorcery (1995)
 Kataklysm Temple of Knowledge (1996)
 Kataklysm Victims of this Fallen World (1998)
 Kataklysm The Prophecy (Stigmata of the Immaculate) (2000)
 Kataklysm Epic: The Poetry of War (2001)
 Kataklysm Shadows & Dust (2002)
 Kataklysm Serenity in Fire (2004)
 Kataklysm In the Arms of Devastation (2006)
 Kataklysm Live in Deutschland DVD (2007)
 Kataklysm Prevail (2008)
 Ex Deo Romulus (2009)
 Kataklysm Heaven's Venom (2010)
 Ex Deo Caligvla (2012)
 Kataklysm Iron Will DVD (2012)
 Kataklysm Waiting for the End to Come (2013)
 Kataklysm Of Ghosts and Gods (2015)
 Ex Deo The Immortal Wars (2017)
 Kataklysm Meditations (2018)

Demos 
 Kataklysm The Death Gate Cycle of Reincarnation (1992)
 Kataklysm Vision the Chaos (1994)

Producer credits 
P (Produced)

E (Engineered)

M (Mix)

MA (Mastered)

 Anhkrehg - Le Mensonge de Massada - E-M
 Anhkrehg - Lands of War - E-M
 Anhkrehg - Against You All - E-M
 Atheretic - Apocalyptic Nature Fury - P-E-M
 At the Seams - Scream of the Fallen (*single) - M-MA
 Anonymus - Chapter Chaos Beguins - P-E-M
 Aphasia - Arcane in Thalassa - E-M
 Augury - Concealed- M
 Augury - Fragmentary Evidence- M
 Blackguard - Progugus Mortis - M
 Blood of Christ - Unrelenting Declivity of Anguish - MA
 Dark Visions of Terror - Local Harassment - M-MA
 Deadsoil - Sacrefice - M
 Despised Icon - Split CD/Bodies in the Gears of the apparatus - P-E-M
 Despised Icon - The Healing Process - M
 Di Lance Corporal - Di Lance Corporal - P-E-M
 Disparaged - Bloodsource - M
 Ex Deo - Romulus - P-E-M
 Ex Deo - CALIGVLA - P-E-M
 Ex Deo - The Immortal Wars - P-E
 Hanker - Web of Faith - P-E-M
 Hanker - Conspiracy Of Mass Extinction - P-E-M
 Helsott - The Healer - M-MA
 Helsott - Slaves and Gods - M-MA
 Infernäl Mäjesty - Demon God - M
 Ire - I Discern an Overtone of Tragedy in Your Voice - P-E-M
 Kataklysm - Temple of Knowledge - M
 Kataklysm - Victims of this Fallen World - P-E-M
 Kataklysm - The Prophecy - P-E-M
 Kataklysm - Epic (The Poetry of War) - P-E-M
 Kataklysm - Shadows & Dust - P-E-M
 Kataklysm - Serenity In Fire - P-E-M
 Kataklysm - In The Arms of Devastation - P-E
 Kataklysm - Live in Deutschland DVD - M
 Kataklysm - Prevail - P-E
 Kataklysm - Heaven's Venom - P-E
 Kataklysm - Iron will DVD - M
 Kataklysm - Waiting For the End to Come - P-E
 Kataklysm - Of Ghosts and Gods - P-E
 Kataklysm - Meditations - P-E
 Kill Everything - Thermal Liquidation (*single) - M-MA
 Krokmitën - Omicron-Omega - MA
 Krokmitën - HETA - MA
 Malevolent Creation - The Will to Kill - E-M
 Malevolent Creation - Conquering South America - M
 Malevolent Creation - Warkult - M
 Man Must Die - ...Start Killing - P-E-M
 Man Must Die - The Human Condition - P-E-M
 Minds - N-coded - P-E-M
 Misery Index - Retaliate - P-E-M
 Necronomicon - Rise of the Elder ones - M-MA
 Necronomicon - Advent of the Human God - M-MA
 Neuraxis - Live Progression - M
 Overbass - Revolution - E
 Profugus Mortis - So it begins - E
 Quo Vadis - Day into night - E
 Quo Vadis - Defiant Indoctrination DVD - E-M
 Redcore - Amyao - P-E-M
 Requiem - Government Denies Knowledge - M
 Skinthelamb - Monolithic - M-MA
 Soulforge - Re-Activate - P-E
 Symbolic - Death tribute DVD - M
 Synastry - Our Memetic Imprints - P-E-M
 Thy Antichrist - Wrath of the Beast - M-MA
 Tormentor Allegoria - Blackwine - M
 VARIOUS ARTISTS Nuclear Blast Records - Gathered At The Altar Of Blast (7" Box) - MA
 VARIOUS ARTISTS Nuclear Blast Records - Death ...is Just the Beginning MMXVIII Box Set - MA

External links
 https://www.jfdstudio.net
 https://www.facebook.com/JFDagenaisOfficial
 https://www.instagram.com/jfdagenais_
 https://www.instagram.com/jfdstudio_

References

1975 births
Living people
Canadian heavy metal guitarists
Canadian male guitarists
Canadian record producers
Canadian audio engineers
French Quebecers
Musicians from Montreal
21st-century Canadian guitarists
21st-century Canadian male musicians